The Big Number Change addressed various issues with the telephone dialling plan in the United Kingdom, during the late-1990s and early-2000s.

The first was an update to a small number of geographic dialling codes in response to the rapid late-1990s growth of telecommunications and impending exhaustion of local numbers in several cities. The change greatly expanded the pool of available numbers within those places while retaining 'local dialling' (the ability to dial local numbers directly, without needing to dial an area code first). The change affected the dialling codes assigned to Cardiff, Coventry, London, Northern Ireland, Portsmouth and Southampton, culminating in a large switch on 22 April 2000. All of these places moved to eight-digit local numbers ensuring sufficient local capacity for many decades (London saw a five-fold increase in capacity, for example). No other geographic area codes were affected.

The other set of changes affected mobile, non-geographic and premium rate numbers, completing a series of steps first detailed almost a decade earlier. In the early-1990s, mobile, non-geographic and premium rate services had used nine-digit numbers with various codes such as 0402, 0645, and 0898 scattered among the similar-looking geographic area codes such as 0384, 0562 and 0949. The number of available codes for new services was quickly dwindling. In 1995, PhONEday partially addressed this by altering all geographic area codes to begin 01, freeing up hundreds of codes beginning 02 to 09 for other uses. Existing mobile, non-geographic and premium rate services continued as before, using various codes from 02 to 09 and with nine-digit numbers.

In 1997 and 1998, mobile, non-geographic and premium rate numbers started to be issued with ten digits and using only specific new prefixes: 070 for personal numbers, 076 for pagers, 077xx, 078xx and 079xx for mobiles, 0800 and 0808 for freephone, 0845 and 0870 for non-geographic revenue-share numbers and 090x for premium rate numbers. Within each of these groups some smaller number blocks were held aside for the older 9-digit mobile, non-geographic and premium rate services to move into at a later date. In 2000 and 2001, the Big Number Change put those final parts into place and they are detailed below.

At the end of the process, there were no numbers in the UK beginning 03, 04 or 06. Additionally, the 02, 05, 07, 08 and 09 ranges were only lightly used. With PhONEday in 1995 and the Big Number Change, the UK had achieved huge spare capacity for new services and simple to understand prefix groupings: 01 and 02 for geographic numbers, 070 for personal numbers, 076 for pagers, 07624, 077, 078 and 079 for mobiles, 0500 and 080 for freephone, 084 and 087 for non-geographic and 090 for premium rate. Further new allocations would initially conform only to those groupings. Over the following decade, the 030, 033, 034, 037, 055, 056, 074, 075, 091 and 098 ranges would also come into use for new services or for further expansion of old services.

Geographic number changes 
These changes set the following areas to use 02 area codes and eight-digit subscriber numbers.

Great Britain 

Note Under the change, the two London areas were reunified under the single (020) code. New numbers beginning with 7, 8 or (later) 3 were allocated regardless of location.

All of the above areas now have an eight-digit local number, in place of their previous six or seven-digit local number. For a short while, you could use either number for local dialling, but local access to the old, shorter numbers was switched off after a few months of parallel running.

Within London, new 70xx xxxx, 71xx xxxx, 80xx xxxx and 81xx xxxx numbers became available for general use. These began to be allocated anywhere in London, with no regard for the 1990-2000 inner/outer London geographical split.

In all of the other areas, new BC0x xxxx and BC1x xxxx numbers became available for general use at the same time (where 'BC' stands for '76' in Coventry, '20' in Cardiff, etc.).

Northern Ireland 

In Northern Ireland, the situation was more complicated. While the primary reason for the changes was the lack of numbering capacity in Belfast (01232), this was not the only reason. When STD codes were introduced in the 1950s, Northern Ireland was allocated only 14 area codes for 34 charging groups. Normal practice in Great Britain was to allocate one area code per charging group but, as calls to Northern Ireland were national rate from anywhere in GB, it was not seen to be necessary to differentiate between all of them. So, area codes covering multiple charge groups ("mixed" areas) were created; in practice this meant that some areas had longer area codes. For example, while Enniskillen was allocated the area code 0365 (0EK5), Kesh was allocated 03656 and Lisnaskea 03657. As a result, numbers in Enniskillen could not begin with 6 or 7, as this would conflict with those of Kesh or Lisnaskea.

All this meant that while Enniskillen's numbers could be six digits long, Kesh's and Lisnaskea's (and those of other dependent exchanges) could only be five digits, due to the 9-digit limit of the length of a phone number at the time. This severely restricted capacity in these areas. As a result, at the Big Number Change, all these dependent exchanges were migrated to different numbers than their parent exchanges; in this instance while Enniskillen's 01365 (the 1 coming from PhONEday) was migrated to 028 66, Kesh went from 013656 to 028 686 and Lisnaskea from 013657 to 028 677. This meant that Kesh could expand into the rest of the 028 68xx range.

Note that the new numbering scheme groups numbers together such that the first digit identifies the county in alphabetical order. The exception is the Greater Belfast area where all numbers begin with 9, regardless of the county. The full list of changes for Northern Ireland is as in the table above.

National dialling only ranges 
In London, old National Dialling Only 0xx xxxx and 1xx xxxx numbers were migrated to new 0axx xxxx and 1axx xxxx numbers (where 'a' is mostly 0 or 1, so far).

In all of the other areas, old National Dialling Only 0xxxxx and 1xxxxx numbers were migrated to new 0aax xxxx and 1aax xxxx numbers.

The migration from old to new numbers was as follows:

Non-geographic number changes

Special services and freephone 
The following changes were made to non-geographic numbering ranges to bring them in the 08xx special services range.

The 0500 (Mercury FreeCall) code remained in use after The Big Number Change, but no new numbers were allocated after 28 April 2001. The 0500 range was eventually ceased on 3 June 2017, with numbers transferred to 0808 5xx xxxx equivalents during a three year transition period prior to that date.

The 0800 (BT Freefone) code has remained, but no new nine-digit numbers have been allocated since 1997. Instead, all 0800 numbers issued since that time have ten digits after the leading 0 or +44.

Premium rate 
The following changes were made to non-geographic numbering ranges to bring them in the  090x premium rate range.

Mobile, pager and personal number changes

Personal numbers 
Personal numbers moved to the 070 range.

Mobile numbers 
The following changes were made to mobile phone numbering ranges to bring them in the 07xxx mobile numbers range.

Pager numbers 
The following codes for pager numbers were also changed, so that all are in the 076 range:

Non-standard pager prefixes beginning 01 were moved to their new 076 allocation.

Some of these codes, as indicated by the arrow "→", had already been changed during PhONEday to add a "1" after the initial zero, and now they have been changed again.

Numbers for drama 
These fictional numbers were originally made available by Oftel for dramatic purposes; for example, for quoting in TV, radio and film programmes. Ofcom revised the list some years after the Big Number Change, and explained: "Telephone Numbers recommended for drama purposes cannot be allocated to Communications Providers for their customers because of the potential influx of calls that customers may receive should their Telephone Numbers be shown in a drama."

Although not directly connected with the official Big Number changes, these number allocations were updated with the new prefixes and with additional areas, as well as changing from 10 to 1000 numbers allocated per block, around the same time as the other Big Number changes occurred.

Misunderstandings 

Some widespread misunderstandings about area codes came about with the Big Number Change, most notably with London area codes. There is a widespread but erroneous assumption that London has several area codes – 0203, 0204, 0207 and 0208 – whereas, in fact, it has just one: 020. Similar misunderstandings came about with a few other area codes.

See also 
 Telephone numbers in the United Kingdom
 List of dialling codes in the United Kingdom
 List of Wales dialling codes
 UK telephone code misconceptions—includes the common "0207" and "0208" misconceptions

Notes

References

External links 
 http://www.ofcom.org.uk/static/archive/oftel/publications/1999/consumer/qanum999.htm
 https://www.telegraph.co.uk/technology/advice/3304080/Bootcamp-116-the-big-number.html
 http://www.area-codes.org.uk/bt_code_changes.jpg

1990s in the United Kingdom
Telephone numbers in the United Kingdom
2000 in the United Kingdom